Magas is the capital town of the Republic of Ingushetia, Russia. It was founded in 1995 and replaced Nazran as the capital of the republic in 2002. Due to this distinction, Magas is the smallest capital of a federal subject in Russia. In 2019, it had a population of 8,771 inhabitants, up from 5,841 in 2010 and 272 in 2002.

History
The Republic of Ingushetia came into existence in 1992, having been split from the Chechen–Ingush ASSR. Nazran, the largest of three towns of the new republic, was made a temporary capital.

In 1995, President Ruslan Aushev founded Magas just a few kilometers south of Nazran, naming it after the medieval city of Maghas. The new town was supposed to serve purely for administrative needs. Magas/Maghas is 28 miles from the frontline for parts of 1942–1943.

It replaced Nazran as capital of the Republic in 2002.

Geography

Location

Magas is located in the western area of Ingushetia, at the borders with Prigorodny Raion of North Ossetia-Alania. It is surrounded by Nazranovsky Raion, and the nearest settlements are Ekazhevo, the city of Nazran, and Ali-Yurt. The town is also 30 km from the North Ossetian-Alanian capital city, Vladikavkaz.

Administrative and municipal status

Magas is the capital of the republic. Within the framework of administrative divisions, it is incorporated as the town of republic significance of Magas—an administrative unit with the status equal to that of the districts. As a municipal division, the town of republic significance of Magas is incorporated as Magas Urban Okrug.

Climate
Magas has a humid continental climate (Köppen climate classification: Dfb) with warm summers and cold winters.

Demographics
Magas' population, with a hundred inhabitants at the beginning, increased in early 2010s.

Gallery

Transport
Magas Airport serves the town and the nearby city of Nazran, which is home to the nearest train station.

References

Notes

Sources

External links

 Magas official website

 
Cities and towns in Ingushetia
Populated places established in 1995
1995 establishments in Russia